David Garrick is a 1916 American silent historical film directed by Frank Lloyd and starring Dustin Farnum, Winifred Kingston and Herbert Standing. The film was based on Thomas William Robertson's 1864 play of the same name, which portrayed the life of the eighteenth century British actor David Garrick. It was one of several film versions of the play made during the silent era.

Cast
 Dustin Farnum as David Garrick 
 Winifred Kingston as Ada Ingot 
 Herbert Standing as Simon Ingot 
 Frank A. Bonn as Squire Richard Chivy 
 Lydia Yeamans Titus as Araminta 
 Olive White as Ada's Aunt 
 Mary Mersch as Fanny Lacy

References

Bibliography
 Goble, Alan. The Complete Index to Literary Sources in Film. Walter de Gruyter, 1999.

External links

1916 films
American biographical drama films
American historical drama films
American silent feature films
1910s historical drama films
1910s English-language films
Films directed by Frank Lloyd
Paramount Pictures films
American films based on plays
Films set in London
Films set in England
Films set in the 18th century
American black-and-white films
Biographical films about actors
1910s biographical drama films
1910s American films
Silent American drama films